Randhir Singh Gentle (September 22, 1922 – September 25, 1981) was an Indian field hockey player and coach. He was a part of the Indian team that won three consecutive gold medals in the Summer Olympics, from 1948 to 1956. Gentle is one among only seven Indians to have won three gold medals at the Games.

Career
Gentle played for India at three Olympic Games, in London in 1948, in Helsinki in 1952 and in Melbourne in 1956. He captained the Indian team at the Melbourne Olympics, following the injury of captain Balbir Singh Sr. in the first game of the league phase against Afghanistan. Gentle finished the tournament scoring six goals, including the winning goal against Pakistan in the final that Indian won 1–0. In the 38th minute, he converted a short corner to goal. India finished the tournament scoring 36 goals and not conceding a single goal.

With the team, he toured East Africa, New Zealand, Australia, Japan and parts of Europe. He was vice-captain of the Indian Hockey Federation XI (IHF XI) side that toured Malaya and Singapore in 1954. The IHF XI won all 16 games played, with Gentle scoring 14 goals in the tour.

He was the head coach of the India hockey team at the 1973 and 1978 Hockey World Cup and the Uganda national hockey team at the 1972 Summer Olympics.

See also
 List of Indian hockey captains in Olympics

References

External links
 
 profile

1922 births
1981 deaths
Field hockey players from Delhi
Olympic field hockey players of India
Field hockey players at the 1948 Summer Olympics
Field hockey players at the 1952 Summer Olympics
Field hockey players at the 1956 Summer Olympics
Indian male field hockey players
Olympic medalists in field hockey
Medalists at the 1956 Summer Olympics
Medalists at the 1952 Summer Olympics
Medalists at the 1948 Summer Olympics
Olympic gold medalists for India
Indian field hockey coaches